Namma Veetu Kalyanam is a 2002 Indian Tamil-language comedy drama film written and directed by V. Sekhar. The film stars Murali, Meena, Vadivelu, Vivek and Vindhya, with Rajeev, Livingston and Manorama in supporting roles. The film released on 27 September 2002 to positive reviews from critics.

Plot 
Ravi (Murali) and Gopi (Vivek) are two graduates who come to Chennai in search of jobs. They stay in Sengalvarayan`s house (Vadivelu), which is owned by Manickam (Livingston), an auto driver. Manickam`s wife has two rich sisters Meena (Meena) and Geetha (Vindhya). Their brother Krishnamurthy (Rajeev) is an MLA. They give Rs.1.5 lakhs to a politician and wait for a job in a college. The two sisters who had rejected a number of proposals earlier fall in love with Ravi and Gopi as Sengalvarayan convinces them that both of them are professors in college. Krishnamurthy's plans to get his sisters married to the two sons of the education minister go awry. But finally Krishnamurthy agrees to his sisters` suitors. But after the wedding, Krishnamurthy and the girls are shocked to know that Murali and Gopi are unemployed. The girls refuse to go with their husbands and the problems begin. How the two takes a vow to win back their wives forms the rest of the story.

Cast 

Murali as Ravi
Vadivelu as Sengalvarayan
Vivek as Gopi
Livingston as Manickam
Meena as Meena
Vindhya as Geetha
Rajeev as MLA Krishnamurthy
Manorama
Sonia
Sindhu as Manickam's wife
Pyramid Natarajan as Minister Ponvannan
Anu Mohan as Divisional Secretary
Ajay Rathnam as Police Officer
Madhan Bob as College Principal
R. Sundarrajan
Kumarimuthu
Pandu
Ammu
Chandrasekhar as Police Commissioner (Guest appearance)

Soundtrack 
Soundtrack was composed by S. A. Rajkumar.

References

External links 
 

2000s Tamil-language films
2002 films
Films directed by V. Sekhar
Films scored by S. A. Rajkumar
Indian comedy-drama films